Christopher Matthew Tolbert (born May 4, 1982) is an American former Major League Baseball infielder who played for the Minnesota Twins from 2008 to 2011. After graduating from Centreville Academy in 2000, Tolbert attended University of Mississippi for four years; he was later drafted by the Baltimore Orioles in 2003 and the Twins in 2004.

Early life
Christopher Matthew Tolbert was born on May 4, 1982, in McComb, Mississippi, and grew up in Woodville, Mississippi, about 1 hour north of Baton Rouge. Tolbert attended high school at Centreville Academy, where he played football and track and field in addition to baseball. In 1998 and 1999, Tolbert's football team won back-to-back state football championships. During his senior season, Tolbert played running back and rushed for 2,561 yards on 326 carries. After graduation in 2000, Tolbert played baseball at the University of Mississippi in Oxford, Mississippi, for the Ole Miss Rebels. Tolbert spent his collegiate career playing shortstop and second base. He was named a Freshman All-American in 2002. The following season, Tolbert was drafted by the Baltimore Orioles, but did not sign with the team. In 2003 and 2004, he played collegiate summer baseball with the Bourne Braves of the Cape Cod Baseball League. In the 2004 Major League Baseball Draft, Tolbert was selected in the 16th round by the Minnesota Twins; he signed with the team on June 16, 2004.

Professional career

Minnesota Twins
Tolbert was selected by the Minnesota Twins in the 16th Round (481st overall) of the 2004 Major League Baseball Draft. Tolbert got his first major league hit on April 2, in the 3rd inning off Los Angeles Angels of Anaheim pitcher Joe Saunders. On April 11, 2008, Tolbert had his first career major league RBI against Kansas City Royals pitcher Gil Meche.

Following the Twins' 2009 spring training camp, Tolbert was optioned to the Triple-A Rochester Red Wings.

On May 6, 2009, Tolbert was called up from Rochester and became the starting second baseman.

Tolbert hit his first major league home run on May 21, 2009, against the Chicago White Sox's Jimmy Gobble. In the game, Tolbert went 3 for 6, scoring two runs and collecting 4 RBIs. Tolbert hit his second home run on September 22, 2009 against the Chicago White Sox's John Danks.

On October 20, 2011, he became a free agent.

Chicago Cubs

On January 20, 2012, Tolbert signed with the Chicago Cubs to a minor league deal.

Philadelphia Phillies

On February 6, 2013, Tolbert signed with the Philadelphia Phillies to a minor league deal.

References

External links

1982 births
Living people
Major League Baseball second basemen
Baseball players from Mississippi
Minnesota Twins players
Elizabethton Twins players
Fort Myers Miracle players
New Britain Rock Cats players
Rochester Red Wings players
Gulf Coast Twins players
Iowa Cubs players
Ole Miss Rebels baseball players
Bourne Braves players
Clearwater Threshers players
Florida Complex League Phillies players
Lehigh Valley IronPigs players
Reading Fightin Phils players